Saint Michael's College of Laguna (SMCL) is an autonomous college in Biñan, Laguna, Philippines, formerly known as Biñan College. SMCL was founded by the nine Limaco sisters, on August 25, 1975.  Luisa Limaco-De Leon provided the idea of building the school, Pura Limaco financed the school's operations, while Milagros Limaco, a teacher, was later elected as the chairman of the board and director of the school. The school was named after the Limaco patriarch, Miguel, a philanthropist.

In 2008, the Philippine Association of Colleges and Universities Commission on Accreditation (PACUCOA), awarded SMCL with a Level III Reaccreditation Status for its Liberal Arts, Business Administration and Teacher Education (Elementary and Secondary) programs. In 2010, the Nursing, Grade School, and High School programs received Level I Formal Accreditation. It was also granted Deregulated Status by the Commission on Higher Education (CHED) in 2003 which was retained for another five years starting in 2009 through a Commission en banc decision. SMCL is also an ISO 9001:2015 certified educational institution.

Academic programs
Tertiary Education Division
Institute of Education and Liberal Arts
Bachelor of Secondary Education, majors: English, Filipino, and Mathematics; Bachelor of Elementary Education, specializations: Pre-School Education and Content Courses; Bachelor of Arts in English; Bachelor of Arts in Filipino
Institute of Nursing
Bachelor of Science in Nursing
Institute of Business Administration
Bachelor of Science in Business Administration, majors: Management Accounting, Marketing Management, Human Resource Development Management
Institute of Hospitality Management and Allied Courses
Bachelor of Science in Hospitality Management; Associate in Hotel and Restaurant Management
Institute of Computer Studies
Bachelor of Science in Computer Science; Associate in Computer Technology
Basic Education Division
K to 12
Polytechnic courses accredited by Technical Education and Skills Development Authority (TESDA)

Accreditation and Certification
The Philippine Association of Colleges and Universities Commission on Accreditation (PACUCOA) accredited all programs of the school. The Federation of Accrediting Agencies of the Philippines (FAAP) certified the grant.
Level IV
Bachelor of Elementary Education
Bachelor of Secondary Education
Bachelor of Arts
Bachelor of Science in Business Administration
Level III Reaccreditation
Bachelor of Science in Nursing
SMCL High School
SMCL Grade School
Bachelor of Science in Hospitality Management
Level II 1st Reaccreditation
Bachelor of Science in Computer Science

Corporate social responsibility
The outreach arm of the school is Lingkod at Pagmamahal ng Saint Michael's College of Laguna Foundation, Inc. (LINGAP-SMCL). LINGAP-SMCL is responsible for the HEAL (Health and Sanitation, Education and Empowerment, Advocacy and Social Awareness, and Livelihood Opportunities) Program. A study on the program's effect to its beneficiaries was accepted in the 4th International Barcelona Conference on Higher Education (2008) of the Global University Network for Innovation (GUNI). SMCL is also a Gawad Kalinga partner (GK1MB school).

Academic Exchange and International Opportunities
SMCL is a member of the University Mobility in Asia and the Pacific.

Student life
Notable student organizations are the following:
 College Student Council (Highest governing council of the Higher Education Division)
 Central Student Council (Highest governing council of the Integrated School)
 SMCL Golden Z Club (Winner for several years, Emma Conlon International Award for Service)
 Z Club of Laguna (Winner for several years, Emma Conlon International Award for Service)
 Michaelean Theater and Dance Co. (Cultural/performing arts group, July 11, 2011 Winner, Showtime - ABS-CBN) 
 SMCL Dance Co. (Cultural/performing arts group)
 The Michaelean Herald (Official student publication, winner in the National Schools Press Conference and Best Culture Writing Page of the National Commission for Culture and the Arts (Philippines))
 Youth for Mary and Christ (Religious movement for high school boys)
 Archangels Pep Squad/Blue Angels Dance Squad (Finalist, NCC Philippines) (Defunct)
 SMCL Angels Varsity Team
 Boy Scouts of the Philippines
 Girl Scouts of the Philippines
 Michaelean Film Collective (2020 Finalist, Documentary Section, Gawad CCP para sa Alternatibong Pelikula at Video)

Institutional Affiliations
Philippine Association of Colleges and Universities (PACU)
Philippine Association of Private Schools, Colleges, and Universities (PAPSCU)
University Mobility in Asia and the Pacific (UMAP)
Association of Southeast Asian Institutions of Higher Learning (ASAIHL)
Laguna Inter-institutional Consortium
PAPSCU Excellent Academic Research Link
CALABARZON Research Council
Philippine Society for Educational Research and Evaluation
Coordinating Council for Private Educational Associations (COCOPEA)
Philippine Association of Administrators of Student Affairs

Notable alumni
Board Placers
Jenechielle S. Lopoy (Top 1 2022 LET Exam)
Culture and the Arts
Clark Rambuyon (Dance)
Silver Dan Belen (Film, Media)
Herald Chavez (Film, TV, Media)
Ryuji "Rui" Fortuna (TV, Modelling)
Bea Nicolas (TV, Film)
Typecast (band) Steve Badiola and Melvin Macatiag (Music)
T-Jay Medina (Palanca awardee)
Jeffrey Hernandez and Mac Amarante (Theater)
Winona Yapit-Diola (Metrobank Outstanding Teacher)
Eleuterio F. Timbol Jr.(2021 Empire State Excellence in Teaching Award -NY, USA) AFTA New York City Ulirang Guro Awardee 2015 
Business
Ma. Guia Lopez de Leon  (Most Outstanding Youth of Laguna 2005)

External links
Official website

References

High schools in Laguna (province)
Universities and colleges in Laguna (province)
Educational institutions established in 1975
Education in Biñan